Crash Bandicoot Nitro Kart 2 is a 2010 racing video game developed by Swedish studio Polarbit and published by Activision for the iPhone and iPod Touch, and a sequel to Crash Bandicoot Nitro Kart 3D. The game is the seventeenth installment in the Crash Bandicoot series. Unlike the original, Nitro Kart 2 has been given an online multiplayer mode. The game was released on May 26, 2010.

Gameplay 
The game features ten playable characters and twelve unique tracks to compete on. Players can use power-ups and weapons gathered on the tracks to hinder opponents. The game features a new online multiplayer mode that allows up to four human players to play together over a Wi-Fi connection on three different modes. Nigel Wood of TouchGen, giving the game a score of 4½ out of 5, praised the game as "a fun and accessible arcade racer and a fantastic online experience", but noted the absence of difficulty settings and lack of originality.

The gameplay of the game is similar to its predecessor and the player moves their kart by moving the iPod or iPhone like a steering wheel, much like many Wii racing games. However, unlike its predecessor, the player can also use a dashboard, press their thumb on the ball and move the karts left and right with that instead. To jump, the player has to touch the screen and touch the weapon picture to launch the weapon. To powerslide the player has to jump and tilt the iPhone.

Playable modes include cup races (tournaments consisting of multiple races), time attack (race the clock), missions, eliminator and multiplayer (which can only be played online or with bluetooth.)

References

External links
 

2010 video games
Crash Bandicoot racing games
IOS games
IPod games
Kart racing video games
Video games developed in Sweden